Wind power in Idaho could generate more energy than the state uses.

Overview
At the end of 2016, Idaho had 973 MW of wind power generating capacity installed, accounting for over 15% of its generated electricity.

Idaho could potentially install 18,000 MW of wind power, capable of generating 52,000 million kWh/year according to a study by the National Renewable Energy Laboratory. Idaho used 23,063 million kWh in 2016

Wind farms

The 125 MW Goshen Wind Farm has been the state's largest wind facility since year 2010.

Wind generation

 Teal background indicates the largest wind generation month for the year.

 Green background indicates the largest wind generation month to date.

Source:

See also
Wind power in the United States
Solar power in Idaho

References

External links

Renewable Energy Projects